Thomas Smith (8 July 1817–26 May 1906) was a Scottish missionary and mathematician who was instrumental in establishing India's zenana missions in 1854. He served as Moderator of the General Assembly of the Free Church of Scotland 1891/92.

Early life
Smith was born in the manse at Symington, Lanarkshire, on 8 July 1817, the eighth of the ten children of Rev. John Smith and his wife Jean (née Stodart). He was educated at the local parish school in Symington and then studied mathematics and physics at the University of Edinburgh, matriculating in 1830 aged 13 (this was normal at that time). In 1834 he studied theology at Divinity Hall in Edinburgh under Rev Dr Thomas Chalmers.

Calling as a missionary

In 1839, under the influence of Rev Alexander Duff, Smith was ordained by the Church of Scotland and travelled to Calcutta in India, as a missionary, teaching mathematics and physics in the schools. From 1840 he suggested the use of female missionaries, because male missionaries were not permitted to speak to the Indian females.

At the Disruption of 1843 Smith left the established church and joined the Free Church of Scotland. The Free Church set up its own mission in Calcutta and Smith transferred to this new building.

From 1851 to 1857 he was editor of the Calcutta Review and Calcutta Christian Observer. In 1840 he proposed the establishment of what would become known as the zenana missions, and his scheme was later implemented in the 1850s by John Fordyce.

When the Indian Mutiny broke out in 1857, Smith acted as the chaplain of the 42nd Highlanders (Black Watch) at Calcutta, accompanying the regiment when it was on active service.

Smith resigned his post in Calcutta in 1858 due to ill-health (claims of cholera are perhaps exaggerated). He returned to Scotland in 1859 when he was recovered enough to travel and settled in Edinburgh to do mission work in the poorest parishes. The following year he became minister of the Free Cowgatehead Mission Church. He then lived in a modest flat at 4 Keir Street, south of the Grassmarket.

In 1880 he was appointed Professor of Evangelistic Theology at New College, Edinburgh, a role in which he continued until 1893. His new-found wealth allowed him to purchase a large villa in the Grange district at 10 Mansionhouse Road.

In 1891 he succeeded Rev Thomas Brown as Moderator of the General Assembly, the highest position in the Free Church.

He received two honorary doctorates from the University of Edinburgh, a Doctor of Divinity (DD) in 1867 and a Doctor of Laws (LLD) in 1900.

He died at home 28 Hatton Place in Edinburgh on 26 May 1906. He is buried in the Grange Cemetery.

Publications
Smith wrote on both mathematical and religious subjects:

An  Elementary  Treatise  on  Plane  Geometry according  to  the  Method  of  Rectilineal Co-ordinates  (Edinburgh,  1857)
Studies  on Pascal  [translated,  from  the  French  of  Alexandre Vinet]  (Edinburgh,  1859)
The  English Puritan  Divines,  50  vols.  (1860-6)
Key-notes of  the  Bible  (Edinburgh,  1866)
Natural  Laws  (Edinburgh,  1867)
The  Clementine Homilies  ["Ante-Nicene  Christian Library,"  xvii.](Edinburgh,  1870)
Mediaeval Missions  [Duff  Missionary  Lecture]  (Edinburgh, 1880)
Life  of  Alexander  Duff,  D.D. [Men  Worth  Remembering]  (London,  1883)
Modem  Missions  and  Culture  [translated,  from the  German  of  G.  Warneck]  (1883)
History of  Protestant  Missions  from  the  Reformation [ibid.]  (1884)
Memoirs  of  James  Begg,  D.D., 2  vols.  (Edinburgh,  1885-8)
Euclid;  his Life  and  System  [World's  Epoch-Makers] (Edinburgh,  1902)
The  Christian's  Patrimony.  Edited  Letters  of  Samuel  Rutherford (Edinburgh,  1881).
Works about Smith:
The  Scotsman,  27 May  1906
Memorial  Notice  [by  Dr  George Smith]  in  Scottish  Review  (31  May  1906)

Family
In 1839, before his departure to India, he married Grace Whyte (d.1886), the daughter of D. K. Whyte, a Royal Navy paymaster and sometime bookseller of 10 Scotland Street in Edinburgh. Their five children were:
David,  died  in  infancy
John,  died  in India
Annie
David  Whyte  Ewart, Sheriff Substitute for Haddingtonshire.
William Whyte,  M.A.,  B.D.,  minister  of  Newington Free  Church,  Edinburgh,  born  2  December 1849,  died  1  March  1904.

Artistic recognition
His portrait by John Henry Lorimer RSA hangs in New College, Edinburgh. A photograph taken in his old age was reproduced in the Scottish Review and Christian Leader for 31 May 1906.

References

Citations

Sources

See also

1817 births
1906 deaths
People from Lanarkshire
19th-century Ministers of the Free Church of Scotland
Scottish Presbyterian missionaries
Presbyterian missionaries in India